Cavendish is a locality in Alberta, Canada.

The locality has the name of Victor Cavendish, 9th Duke of Devonshire, 11th Governor General of Canada.

References 

Localities in Special Area No. 2